Nicolette "Nicky" Zeeman (born 3 December 1956) is a British literary scholar. She has been Professor of Medieval and Renaissance English at the University of Cambridge since January 2016 and a Fellow of King's College, Cambridge since 1995.

Zeeman is the daughter of Sir Christopher Zeeman, a mathematician, and Elizabeth Salter, who was an academic specialising in medieval literature.

Selected works

References

 

 
 
 

1956 births
Living people
British literary historians
British literary critics
British women literary critics
British medievalists
Chaucer scholars
Fellows of King's College, Cambridge
Women medievalists
Women literary historians
British women historians
Professors of Medieval and Renaissance English (Cambridge)